František Balvín (January 7, 1915 – October 20, 2003) was a Czechoslovak cross-country skier who competed in the late 1930s, 1940s and early 1950s. Competing in two Winter Olympics, he finished 11th in the 50 km event in 1948 and 21st in the 50 km event in 1952. He was born in Nové Město na Moravě, Vysočina in the Czech Republic.

References

External links
Olympic 50 km cross country skiing results: 1948-64

Olympic cross-country skiers of Czechoslovakia
Cross-country skiers at the 1948 Winter Olympics
Cross-country skiers at the 1952 Winter Olympics
Czech male cross-country skiers
Czechoslovak male cross-country skiers
1915 births
2003 deaths
People from Nové Město na Moravě
Sportspeople from the Vysočina Region